Renald is a given name.  Notable people with the name include:
Renald Castillon, French motorcycle racer
Rénald Metelus (born 1993), French footballer
Renald Knysh (1931–2019), Soviet and Belarusian coach in artistic gymnastics coach
Jean Rénald Clérismé (1937–2013), Haitian politician and priest